Getulio Agostini (1943–1990) was a botanist and professor in Venezuela specializing in Myrsinaceae (now included in the Primulaceae).

Professional 
He was secretary of the Venezuelan Association for the Advancement of University Research from 1983 to 1985.

References

External links 

 JSTOR Plant Science: Agostini, Getulio (1943-1990)
 Tropicos: Agostini, Getulio
 Índice Internacional de Nombres de las Plantas: Getulio Agostini

Botanists with author abbreviations
1943 births
1990 deaths
20th-century botanists